Mr. Wint and Mr. Kidd are fictional characters in the James Bond novel and film, Diamonds Are Forever. In the novel, Wint and Kidd are members of The Spangled Mob. In the film, it is assumed that they are main villain Ernst Stavro Blofeld's henchmen, though the characters share no scenes with and are not seen taking instructions from Blofeld (or anyone else, except for Bert Saxby).  One of their trademarks is trading quips after killing their targets; they also do so after a failed attempt to kill Bond. In the film, Wint is played by Bruce Glover and Kidd by jazz musician Putter Smith in a rare acting role.

In novel 
As killers and enforcers to the Spangled Mob, Wint and Kidd are tasked, among other things, to make sure the smuggling of the diamonds and everything connected to it go off without a hitch. If something does go wrong, Wint and Kidd (they are never referred to as "Mr." in the novel) are sent to "persuade" the perpetrators never to make a mistake again. They take sadistic pleasure in killing; this is particularly evident in a scene in which they pour boiling mud over the face of a jockey who they believe has prevented a Mob-owned horse from winning a race.

From London to New York City it is their job to tail whoever is smuggling the diamonds internationally to ensure that the smuggler does not get any ideas about going into business for himself. For this, the duo pose as American businessmen who call themselves "W. Winter" and "B. Kitteridge". Although they are both hardened assassins, Wint is pathologically afraid of traveling. When he must do so, he wears an identifying name tag and a sticker that says "My blood group is F." He also has to be paid a special bonus by his employers. Because of his phobia, Wint picked up the nickname "Windy", although no one would dare call him that to his face. Kidd is nicknamed "Boofy" due to his "pretty-boy" appearance. Felix Leiter suspects that they are both homosexual, a point emphasized in the film.  Wint has a large red wart on one thumb, a detail that allows Leiter to confirm his involvement when Bond mentions it.

In a ghost town outside Las Vegas, the leading gangster, Seraffimo Spang, penetrates Bond's cover and orders Wint and Kidd to torture Bond to learn his true identity. Wint and Kidd then perform a "Brooklyn stomping," kicking Bond into unconsciousness while wearing football cleats, after which smuggler Tiffany Case helps him escape. After they kidnap Tiffany on the Queen Elizabeth, Bond comes to her rescue by climbing down the side of the ship and diving into her cabin via the porthole. They have a fight, and Bond shoots them both. To avoid trouble, he then fakes evidence in the cabin to make it look like a murder-suicide. After the killings, Bond considers his relationship with Tiffany and wonders if it will last forever. But he notices the dead eyes of the assassins staring at him. Bond imagines they say "nothing lasts forever, except what you did to me!" — a reference to the book's title.

In film 
Mr. Wint and his partner Mr. Kidd are American assassins working for Ernst Stavro Blofeld (Charles Gray), although are never seen interacting with him. Their assignment is to dismantle Blofeld's diamond smuggling pipeline which, for almost two years, has been diverting diamonds to Blofeld, who is using them to construct a powerful laser satellite. With the satellite almost completed and both CIA and MI6 investigations showing too much interest in Blofeld's activities, the smuggling pipeline must be eliminated to cover Blofeld's trail. Wint and Kidd are sent to kill off anyone who comes into contact with the diamonds after they have done their part in the diamond smuggling operation. They follow the final shipment of diamonds through the pipeline running from South Africa to the United States via the Netherlands. As Mr. Wint says, "Curious how everyone who touches those diamonds seems to die." 

The pair takes a sadistic pleasure in their work — for example, to Mr. Wint's amusement when Mr. Kidd photographs the body of the old lady (Mrs. Whistler) they have drowned in the canals of Amsterdam, joking about sending the pictures to the primary-age children to whom she was a school teacher. This is typical of an overtly morbid sense of humour they share, completing each other's sentences as a game and delighting in competing over laboured, blackly humorous puns. Thus an attempt to incinerate James Bond alive in a crematorium is "a glowing tribute" and "heart-warming." They also amuse themselves with the twisted application of proverbs — for example, after blowing up a helicopter in flight Mr. Kidd begins the old quote, "If God had wanted man to fly ..." to which Mr. Wint concludes: "He would have given him wings, Mr. Kidd"; and Mr. Wint saying "If at first you don't succeed, Mr. Kidd", followed by Mr. Kidd's reply, "Try, try again, Mr. Wint."

Although working closely as partners, they never address each other by their first names, instead preferring the more courtly and conventional title of courtesy - “mister”. It is strongly implied in the film that the two are lovers. They are seen holding hands in one scene; Mr. Wint also has a habit of putting on women's perfume; and at one point, Mr. Kidd remarks that Tiffany Case (Jill St. John) is attractive, "... for a lady," after which Mr. Wint looks at him jealously.

The two use numerous and creative methods of killing their targets such as:  
 Placing a scorpion down the shirt of a South African dentist.
 Using a time bomb to blow up the helicopter which was meant to pick up the doctor's merchandise.
 Drowning Mrs. Whistler in the Amstel River, and then joking about sending photographs of the corpse being recovered back to her schoolchildren in South Africa.
 Sealing Bond in a coffin and sending him into a crematorium furnace. Bond escapes when his mob contacts discover that the diamonds he had given them are fakes and retrieve the coffin from the furnace just in time.
 Drowning Plenty O'Toole (Lana Wood) confusing her with Tiffany Case, with her legs tied to a block of concrete, in a swimming pool just deep enough to submerge her only up to the tip of her nose, and by doing so killing her as slowly as possible.
 Burying Bond alive by putting him into a length of pipeline to be buried in the desert outside Las Vegas — the second time he has been unconscious at their mercy, yet again they opt for an overly elaborate kill. Upon regaining consciousness, Bond escapes by short-circuiting a pipeline welding device, forcing some workers to inspect it.
 In a deleted scene made available in DVD release, shooting the character Shady Tree (Leonard Barr) with a joke prop gun that first produces a flag with "BANG!" written on it, before a real bullet.

Their final attempt to kill Bond and Case takes place on the SS Canberra cruise liner after Bond foils Blofeld's plot. They pose as stewards in the couple's suite, serving them a romantic dinner which they claim is courtesy of Willard Whyte; the meal consists of Oysters Andaluz, shashlik, tidbits, prime rib au jus and Salade Utopia. Dessert is La Bombe Surprise — in the most literal sense, since it has an actual bomb hidden inside it. However, when Mr. Wint opens the wine bottle and gives Bond the cork to smell, Bond catches the scent of Mr. Wint's cologne, links it to his misadventure in the pipeline and quickly realizes that something is wrong. He comments on the cologne, describing it as "potent" and "strong enough to bury anything". 

After tasting a glass of Mouton Rothschild '55, Bond casually remarks that he had expected a claret with such a grand dinner. When Mr. Wint replies that the ship's cellars are poorly stocked with clarets, Bond exposes the henchman's ignorance, replying that Mouton Rothschild in fact is a claret, before remarking "I've smelt that aftershave before, and both times I've smelt a rat." Realizing Bond is on to them, the pair drop the charade and attack him; Mr. Kidd ignites the shashlik skewers and moves to impale Bond with them, while Mr. Wint strangles him with the chain from which his sommelier's tastevin is suspended. During the struggle, Bond first neutralizes Mr. Kidd by splashing Courvoisier on him and the flaming skewers, setting the assassin on fire. Within seconds, Mr. Kidd is engulfed in flames, and in desperation he jumps overboard into the ocean. Case throws the dessert at Mr. Wint, but she misses and inadvertently reveals the bomb hidden in the cake. 

Bond gains the upper hand against Mr. Wint, pulling the villain's coat-tails between his legs and tying his hands and the bomb together with them. Bond flips Mr. Wint overboard as the bomb explodes between his legs, killing him before he hits the water.

Cultural impact 
 These two are parodied as the characters "Mr. Wink" and "Mr. Fibb" in the animated series Codename: Kids Next Door.
The pair is parodied in Daniel Waters' Sex and Death 101, which features a lesbian couple named Bambi Wint and Thumper Kidd. The women have the surnames of the male assassins and the first names of Willard Whyte's female bodyguards, and they converse in the same distinctive, polite speech patterns as the henchmen. 
 A London diamond jewellery store, established in 2002, is named Wint & Kidd after the characters.
 In the Fallout 3 add-on Broken Steel, a pair of ghouls the player may encounter on a mission are named "Wint" and "Kidd".
The 2003 TV series incarnation of the Teenage Mutant Ninja Turtles franchise introduces two superpowered criminal mercenaries called Mister Touch and Mister Go, who dialogue in the same way as Wint and Kidd.
The DC Animated Universe series Static Shock features two miscreant students, Specs and Trapper, who address each other in the same affected manner used by Wint and Kidd.
 In the second episode of the first series of The League of Gentlemen, two surveyors arrive in Royston Vasey called Mr. Wint and Mr. Kidd. The characters use the same genteel speech patterns as Wint and Kidd in Diamonds Are Forever.
 In the video game Fur Fighters, two Siamese Bears named Mr. Grr and Mr. Arrgh attack the player in a funhouse that gradually laps the player's health due to its hypnotic influence. The funhouse is disabled when the bears are killed.

References

External link 
Mr. Wint & Mr. Kidd - MI6

Bond villains
Characters in British novels of the 20th century
Fictional assassins
Fictional gay males
Fictional henchmen
Literary characters introduced in 1956
Male literary villains
Male film villains
Literary duos
Fictional LGBT characters in film
Fictional American people
LGBT villains
Film supervillains